Coricancha, Koricancha, Qoricancha or Qorikancha ("The Golden Temple," from Quechua quri gold; kancha enclosure) was the most important temple in the Inca Empire.  It is located in Cusco, Peru, which was the capital of the empire.

History 
Originally named Intikancha or Intiwasi, it was dedicated to Inti, and is located at the former Inca capital of Cusco.  Most of the temple was destroyed after the 16th-century war with the Spanish conquistadors, as settlers also took it apart to build their own churches and residences. Much of its stonework was used as the foundation for the seventeenth-century Santo Domingo Convent. It was built after the 1650 earthquake destroyed the first Dominican convent.

To construct Coricancha, the Inca used ashlar masonry, building from the placement of similarly sized cuboid stones that they had cut and shaped for this purpose. The use of ashlar masonry made the temple much more difficult to construct, as the Inca did not use any stone with a slight imperfection or break. By choosing this masonry type, the Inca intentionally demonstrated the importance of the building through the extent of the labor necessary to build the structure. Through the arduous labor needed to construct buildings with ashlar masonry, this form of construction came to signify the Inca's imperial power to mobilize and direct local labor forces. The replication throughout Andean South America of Inca architectural techniques, such as those employed at Coricancha, expressed the extent of Inca control over a vast geographic region.

Pachakutiq Inca Yupanqui rebuilt Cusco and the House of the Sun, enriching it with more oracles and edifices, and adding plates of fine gold.  He provided vases of gold and silver for the Mama-cunas, nuns or cloistered women, to use in the veneration services.  Finally, he took the bodies of the seven deceased Incas and adorned them with masks, head-dresses, medals, bracelets, and sceptres of gold, placing them on a golden bench.

The walls were once covered in sheets of gold, and the adjacent courtyard was filled with golden statues. Spanish reports tell of an opulence that was "fabulous beyond belief". When the Spanish in 1533 required the Inca to raise a ransom in gold for the life of their leader Atahualpa, most of the gold was collected from Coricancha.

The Spanish colonists built the Convent of Santo Domingo on the site, demolishing the temple and using its foundations for the cathedral. They also used parts of the building for other churches and residences. Construction took most of a century. This is one of numerous sites where the Spanish incorporated Inca stonework into the structure of a colonial building. Major earthquakes severely damaged the church, but the Inca stone walls, built out of huge, tightly interlocking blocks of stone, still stand due to their sophisticated stone masonry. Nearby is an underground archaeological museum that contains mummies, textiles, and sacred idols from the site.

Inca astronomy

Similarities are found in the semicircular temples found in the Temple of the Sun in Cusco, the Torreon in Machu Picchu, and the Temple of the Sun in Písac.  In particular, all three exhibit a "parabolic enclosure wall" of the finest stonework, as Bingham describes it.  These structures were also used for similar purposes, including the observation of solstices and Inca constellations.

Within the Milky Way, which the Inca called mayu or Celestial River, the Inca distinguished dark area or clouds, which they called yana phuyu.  These were considered silhouettes or shadows of animals drinking from the river water.  Amongst the animals named by the Inca, was a llama extended from Scorpius to Alpha Centauri and Beta Centauri, in which those two stars formed the llama's eyes, or llamaq ñawin.  A baby llama, llama-cría, was inverted underneath.  To the left of the llamas is a red-eyed fox, atuq, which lies between Sagittarius and the tail of Scorpius.  The tail of Scorpius is known as a storehouse, or qullqa.  A partridge, yutu, was just below the Southern Cross, and a toad, hamp'atu, to the lower right.  A serpent, machaguay, extends off to the right.

During the Inti Raymi, the Sapa Inca and curacas would proceed from the Haucaypata, where they greeted the rising June solstice sun, to the inner court of the Coricancha.  On a bench in the "sun room", the Sapa Inca sat with the mummies of his ancestors.  This and other rooms were oriented northeast–southwest, shingled in gold plate, and embedded with emeralds and turquoise.  Focusing the sun's rays with a concave mirror, the Sapa Inca would light a fire for the burnt sacrifice of llamas.  Children were also sacrificed in certain circumstances; they were brought to Cusco following a ceque and huaca route of tribute.

The Coricancha is located at the confluence of two rivers.  Here, according to Inca myth, is where Manco Cápac decided to build the Coricancha, the foundation of Cusco, and the eventual Inca Empire.  According to Ed Krupp, "The Inca built the Coricancha at the confluence because that place represented terrestrially the organizing pivot of heaven."

Images

See also
Convent of Santo Domingo, Cusco
List of buildings and structures in Cusco
Pedro Cieza de Leon's The Chronicle of Peru
Inca Garcilaso de la Vega's Comentarios Reales de los Incas
Felipe Guamán Poma de Ayala's The First New Chronicle and Good Government
Iperu, tourist information and assistance
Tourism in Peru

References

External links 
 
 “The Political Force of Images,” Vistas: Visual Culture in Spanish America, 1520-1820.

Temples of Inti
Buildings and structures in Cusco
Tourist attractions in Cusco Region
Archaeological sites in Cusco Region
Archaeological sites in Peru